The Journal of Surgical Research is a peer-reviewed medical journal covering surgery-related research. It was established in 1961 and is published fourteen times per year by Elsevier on behalf of the Association for Academic Surgery, of which it is the official journal. The editor-in-chief is Scott LeMaire (Baylor College of Medicine). According to the Journal Citation Reports, the journal has a 2016 impact factor of 2.187.

References

External links

Surgery journals
Elsevier academic journals
Publications established in 1961
English-language journals
Academic journals associated with learned and professional societies of the United States
Journals published between 13 and 25 times per year